A continuous presence of Islam in Belarus began in the 14th century. From this time it was primarily associated with the Lipka Tatars, many of whom settled in the Polish–Lithuanian Commonwealth while continuing their traditions and religious beliefs. With the advent of the Soviet Union, many Muslims left Belarus for other countries, particularly Poland. Presently, the Belarusian Muslim community consists of remaining Lipka Tatars, as well as recent immigrants from the Middle East. As of 2007, there are 45,000 Muslims in Belarus, representing 0.5% of the total population.

History
The history of Islam in Belarus begins in the 14th century, as the Grand Duchy of Lithuania invited Tatars from the Golden Horde to assist with the protection of their borders. The Tatars, however, soon settled in Lithuania, as well as in neighbouring Poland, and by the end of the 16th century, an estimated 100,000 Tatars lived in the Polish–Lithuanian Commonwealth, including the descendants of border guards, voluntary immigrants, and prisoners of war. From this group came the Lipka Tatars. In the early 19th century, several Tatars fled to the Ottoman Empire amidst rumours of forced baptisms of Muslims.

20th century

Russian Civil War and interwar period 
During the Russian Civil War and the Polish–Soviet War, Muslim leaders protected Jews from pogroms; the mullah of Uzda hid the local Jewish population in his cellar, and helped Jews flee westwards by disguising them as Muslims. In the Byelorussian Soviet Socialist Republic, Islam was a target of religious persecution; in 1935, closures of mosques began, the mullah of Uzda was deported to Siberia, and the mullah and muezzin of Smilavičy were executed.

World War II 
During the Eastern Front of World War II, Nazi Germany sought to express itself as a protector of Islam, and there were attempts to win over the Belarusian Muslim community. In 1942, during the German occupation of Byelorussia, the Minsk Mosque, which had been closed in 1936 and used as a food bank, was reopened. The 1st Eastern Muslim SS Regiment also fought Belarusian partisans in Minsk Region until being merged into the Dirlewanger Brigade.

Post-World War II 
From 1944 to 1946, many Lipka Tatar religious leaders, fearing renewed religious persecution, fled Belarus for Poland. This complicated the work of the Council for the Affairs of Religious Cults of the Soviet Union. The community of Iŭje, in Grodno Region, became the largest recognised religious community in Belarus. In the 1950s, the Iŭje Muslims continued celebrating Eid al-Adha and did not work on Fridays. After the dissolution of the Kletsk Islamic community in 1960, Iŭje was the only remaining Islamic community in Belarus, though private practice of Islam continued.

Since 1991 
In 1994, the First All-Belarusian Congress of Muslims was held. As a result, the Muslim Religious Community of the Republic of Belarus was founded. From its foundation until 2005, the Muslim Religious Community of the Republic of Belarus was headed by Ismail Alieksandrovič. Since 2005, it has been led by Abu-Biekir Šabanovič.

In 2007, the Ahmadiyya Muslims were banned from practising their faith openly, and given a similar status to other banned religious groups in the country. Unable to obtain state registration, Ahmadi Muslims in the country, who number about 30, including 13 native Belarusians, cannot conduct their activities formally as a group, such as importing or distributing literature, gathering together for prayers or meetings, and having an official representative.

Belarus is the only country in Europe to have jailed a newspaper editor for publishing the Danish cartoons of the Islamic prophet Muhammad. On 18 January 2008, Alexander Sdvizhkov was jailed for three years for 'incitement of religious hatred'.

Present situation 
Today, there are 7 mosques in Belarus: Smilavičy, Iŭje, Slonim, and Navahrudak in the Grodno Region, Minsk and Kletsk in the Minsk Region, and Vidzy in the Vitebsk Region. From 1900 to 1902, a mosque was constructed in Minsk, but it was destroyed in 1962. On 11 November 2016, a replica of the mosque was opened in Minsk. There are 30 religious organisations officially registered, and 25 religious communities, of which 24 are Sunni and one is Shia. Most Belarusian Muslims are Sunni, of the Hanafi school.

Lipka Tatars no longer speak their native language, and primarily switched to Belarusian, Russian, and Polish. However, for the purposes of religious practices, Arabic is used. Historically, the Belarusian Arabic alphabet was developed by Muslims to write the Belarusian language in the Arabic script, then commonly used by Tatars, as they abandoned their own Tatar language for Belarusian. However, the Belarusian Arabic alphabet has fallen out of use in the modern age.

Gallery

See also
Religion in Belarus
Freedom of religion in Belarus

References

External links
 Muslim Spiritual Board in the Republic of Belarus Republican Religious Association (News)
 Muslim Spiritual Board in the Republic of Belarus Republican Religious Association 
 Belarusian Cathedral Mosque site 

 
Belarus
Islam in the Soviet Union